The Altena was a Dutch motorcycle and automobile made by NV Haarlemsche Automobiel & Motorrijwielfabriek, based in Haarlem-Heemstede from 1900 to 1906.

The first car built was powered by a 3.5 hp De Dion single-cylinder powerplant. From 1905 models having 8, 10, and 12 hp engines were offered.

The company was declared bankrupt in 1906 but a few cars were advertised into 1907.

It is estimated that some 40 or 50 cars were made.

Literature
 Harald H. Linz, Halwart Schrader:  The big automobile Encyclopedia , BLV, München 1986, .
 G. N. Georgano:  cars. Encyclopédie complète. 1885 à nos jours.  Courtille, 1975 (French)
G. Marshall Naul, "Altena", in G.N. Georgano, ed., The Complete Encyclopedia of Motorcars 1885-1968  (New York: E.P. Dutton and Co., 1974), pp. 38.

Links 

 GTÜ Society for Technical Supervision mbH (accessed on 22 December 2013)
Google Übersetzer für Unternehmen:Translator ToolkitWebsite-Übersetzergoogle
Über Google ÜbersetzerCommunityMobilÜber GoogleDatenschutzerklärung & Nut

Car manufacturers of the Netherlands
Motorcycle manufacturers of the Netherlands
Dutch companies established in 1900
Vehicle manufacturing companies established in 1900